Pymatuning State Park can refer to either of two adjoining state parks in the United States:

Pymatuning State Park (Ohio)
Pymatuning State Park (Pennsylvania)